Herwig Maehler, FBA (29 April 1935 – 29 October 2021) was a German historian and papyrologist, who specialized in classics and ancient history.

Biography 

He completed his PhD at the University of Hamburg in 1961. In 1975, he completed his Habilitation in classics from the Free University of Berlin.

He has worked as a curator of Greek papyri at Egyptian Museum of Berlin. He was the Emeritus Professor of Papyrology at the University College London.

Awards 

He was a fellow of the British Academy.

Bibliography 

Some of his books are:

 The Vienna Epigrams Papyrus
 Pindari Carmina cvm Fragmentis: Pars II: Fragmenta. Indices
 Die Lieder des Bakchylides
 Schrift, Text Und Bild: Kleine Schriften Von Herwig Maehler
 Urkunden Aus Hermupolis  
 Die Auffassung des Dichterberufs im fruhen Griechentum bis zur Zeit Pindars
 Urkunden römischer Zeit

References

External links

 http://www.ae-info.org/ae/Member/Maehler_Herwig
 http://www.ae-info.org/ae/Member/Maehler_Herwig/CV
 http://britac.ac.uk/user/1741

1935 births
2021 deaths
20th-century German historians
University of Hamburg alumni
German papyrologists
Writers from Berlin
Fellows of the British Academy
Free University of Berlin alumni
Alumni of University College London